"Pray for Me" is a song by Canadian singer the Weeknd and American rapper Kendrick Lamar from the soundtrack album of the Marvel Studios superhero film Black Panther. The song was released by Top Dawg Entertainment, Aftermath Entertainment, and Interscope Records on February 2, 2018, as the album's third and final single. It serves as the second overall collaboration between the two artists. The song appears in the movie during the scene where the titular hero along with his allies, Nakia and Okoye, enter a secret casino in Busan.

Background and release
The Weeknd first hinted at his involvement with the Black Panther soundtrack album with an Instagram post that he made on January 19, 2018, which contained an illustration of the Marvel superhero Black Panther perched on a tree in front of the moon. On January 26, 2018, the Weeknd then further hinted at his involvement with the soundtrack when he uploaded an official trailer for the Black Panther film to his Instagram account. Then on January 31, 2018, Lamar confirmed the Weeknd's involvement with the soundtrack when he uploaded to his Twitter account the complete tracklist of the soundtrack, which contained the song "Pray for Me". On February 1, 2018, the Weeknd uploaded to his Twitter account a video teasing the release date for "Pray for Me" as the soundtrack's third single.

Composition
"Pray for Me" is composed in the key of E minor.

Reception
Alex Robert Ross of Noisey praised the song, calling it "short, punchy, and self-lacerating."

Copyright infringement lawsuit
In February 2020, Tesfaye and Lamar were sued by now-split American experimental rock band Yeasayer for alleged plagiarism due to vocal similarities with their 2007 song "Sunrise". According to the lawsuit, the part allegedly stolen from the song includes "the recording of a distinctive choral performance, which Plaintiffs [Yeasayer] created and recorded using their own voices". Furthermore, Yeasayer claims that "Defendants extracted Plaintiffs’ choral performance from a recording of 'Sunrise,' slightly modified it, including, on information and belief, via postprocessing to alter its pitch, among other qualities" and then subsequently used the modified audio in their own song. Both Tesfaye and Lamar have denied the accusation. The lawsuit later reached its conclusion in July 2020, after Yeasayer dropped it.

Credits and personnel
Credits and personnel adapted from digital booklet.

 Kendrick Lamar – songwriting, lead vocals
 The Weeknd – songwriting, lead vocals
 Frank Dukes – songwriting, production
 Doc McKinney – songwriting, production, recording
 Beatriz Artola – recording
 Shin Kamiyama – recording
 Mike Sonier – recording
 Barry McCready – recording assistance
 Jaycen Joshua – mixing
 David Nakaji – mixing assistance
 Mike Bozzi – mastering
 Chris Athens – mastering

Charts

Weekly charts

Year-end charts

Certifications

Release history

References

External links
 
 

2018 songs
2018 singles
Black Panther (film series)
Kendrick Lamar songs
Marvel Cinematic Universe songs
Songs involved in plagiarism controversies
Songs written by Doc McKinney
Songs written by Frank Dukes
Songs written by Kendrick Lamar
Songs written by the Weeknd
The Weeknd songs
Songs written by DaHeala
Interscope Records singles
Aftermath Entertainment singles
Top Dawg Entertainment singles
Song recordings produced by Frank Dukes
Pop-rap songs